Aleksei Igorevich Kontsedalov (born 24 July 1990) is a Russian professional association football player.

Club career
He made his Russian Premier League debut on 9 July 2010 for PFC Krylia Sovetov Samara in a game against FC Rubin Kazan.

In August 2021, Kontsedalov joined Kyzyltash Bakhchisaray.

Personal life
His older brother Roman Kontsedalov is also a professional football player.

Career statistics

References

External links
 
 
 
 Aleksei Kontsedalov at CFU

1990 births
People from Valuyki, Belgorod Oblast
Living people
Russian footballers
Russia youth international footballers
Association football defenders
Russian Premier League players
PFC Krylia Sovetov Samara players
FC Baltika Kaliningrad players
FC Rostov players
FC Armavir players
FC Moscow players
FC Avangard Kursk players
FC Dynamo Stavropol players
FC Aktobe players
Russian expatriate footballers
Expatriate footballers in Kazakhstan
Kazakhstan First Division players
Sportspeople from Belgorod Oblast